The Ministry of Energy and Mines of Peru (Spanish: Ministerio de Energía y Minas de Perú, MINEM), is the government ministry responsible for the energetic and mining sectors of Peru. Additionally, it is charged with overseeing the equal distribution of energy throughout the country. , the minister of energy is Alessandra Herrera.

Objectives
1. To promote the proportional, efficient, and competitive use and development of energy resources in the context of decentralization and regional development, prioritizing private investment, meeting demand, as well as the employment of alternative energy in the process of rural electrification.

2. To promote the development of the mining sub sector, to impulse private investment and legal stability, to encourage the fair exploitation and implementation of clean energy technologies in small-scale mining and in the context of the process of regional decentralization.

3. To promote the protection of the environment, with respect to energy and mining corporations as well as to encourage friendly relations between private entities, consumers, and civil society.

4. To bring about and develop planning for the sector and its institutions, as well as the efficient and effective administration of resources.

See also
Council of Ministers of Peru
Government of Peru

External links
Official Website of the Ministry of Energy and Mines of Peru

Peru
Energy